Return of the Boogeyman (also known as Boogeyman III) is a 1994 American horror film directed by Deland Nurse. It was released in the US by Sony Pictures.

The film contains scenes of graphic violence, and is mostly made up of stock footage from The Boogeyman.

Plot
The film revolves around a young woman named Annie (Kelly Galindo) who has horrible nightmares every time she goes to sleep. She soon realizes that her dreams are predictions of the oncoming slaughter of the Boogeyman. She and her friends then set off to stop him.

Critical reception
The film has terrible critical reviews, including HorrorNews which said "Return of the Boogeyman is a terrible film and should pretty much be avoided at all cost".

Notability
This film is the first commercially available DVD ever produced in the United States.

References

1994 films
American supernatural horror films
1994 horror films
1990s English-language films
1990s American films